This is a list of airlines of Manitoba which have an air operator's certificate issued by Transport Canada, the country's civil aviation authority. These are airlines that are based in Manitoba.

Current airlines

Defunct airlines

References

Manitoba
Aviation in Manitoba
Airlines